Becky Hogge (born 1979 in London) is a UK-based music and technology writer and the first full-time executive director of the Open Rights Group, resigning in 2008. She was previously the managing editor, and then the technology director and technology commissioning editor for openDemocracy.net. During her time with openDemocracy she helped establish the China environment website chinadialogue.net, along with editor Isabel Hilton. She is a former board member of the Open Knowledge Foundation. and a member of its advisory board.

As a writer and commentator, she covers the global politics of technology, open source, and intellectual property rights. She writes a weekly technology column for the New Statesman and openDemocracy and has also written for The Guardian, and Prospect, In 2011 she published a book about the hacker culture entitled Barefoot into Cyberspace: Adventures in search of techno-Utopia.

References

External links
 Barefoot into Cyberspace: Adventures in search of techno-Utopia

Living people
1979 births
British columnists
Articles containing video clips